Land management is the process of managing the use and development of land resources (in both urban and rural settings, but it is mostly managed in Urban places). Land resources are used for a variety of purposes which may include organic agriculture, reforestation, water resource management and eco-tourism projects. Land management can have positive or negative effects on the terrestrial ecosystems. Land being over- or misused can degrade and reduce productivity and disrupt natural equilibriums.

See also

 Conservation grazing
 Environmental management scheme
 Habitat conservation
 Holistic management
 Land change science
 Land registration
 Sustainable agriculture
Wildlife management

References

Further reading
 Dale P.D. and McLaughlin, J.D. 1988. Land Information Management, Clarendon Press: Oxford. 
 Larsson G. 2010. Land Management as Public Policy, University Press of America. . 
 United Nations Department of Economic and Social Affairs Agenda 21 
 

 
Management by type